The 2012 FAM League is the sixtieth season of the FAM League since its establishment in 1952.  The season began on 3 March 2012 and is due to end on 1 July 2012. Betaria are the defending champions, having won their 1st league title the previous season.
A total of 9 teams are contesting in the league.

Teams
The following teams participated in the 2012 Malaysia FAM League. In order by the number given by FAM:-

 Malacca FA
 Melodi Jaya S.C.
 PBAPP F.C. ( New Team )
 Penang FA (Relegated from 2011 Malaysia Premier League)
 Shahzan Muda S.C.
 SDM Navy Kepala Batas F.C. (Relegated from 2011 Malaysia Premier League)
 KL SPA FC
 Tentera Darat FC
 UiTM FC

Withdrawn Teams

  Rapid KL FC
  TUDM Hornet FC
  MBJB FC
  Kor RAMD FC

Team summaries

Stadia

Personnel and kits

Note: Flags indicate national team as has been defined under FIFA eligibility rules. Players and Managers may hold more than one non-FIFA nationality.

League table

Results

Fixtures and Results of the Malaysia FAM League 2012 season.

Week 1

Week 2

Week 3

Week 4

Week 5

Week 6

Week 7

Week 8

Week 9

Week 10

Week 11

Week 12

Week 13

Week 14

Week 15

Week 16

Round table

Play-offs

Premier League/FAM League
The play-off matches to determine promotion and relegation will be held at Hang Tuah Stadium and Hang Jebat Stadium, Malacca on 17 July 2012. Team that finished 7th in the Premier League, Pos Malaysia FC will meet second placed team in FAM League, Shahzan Muda FC, while team that finished 9th in the Premier League, Muar Municipal Council FC will meet team that finished 10th in the Premier League, Betaria FC. The winner of both matches will stay in the 2013 Malaysia Premier League; the losing teams will be relegated to 2013 Malaysia FAM League.

Pos Malaysia FC and Muar Municipal Council FC won their respective matches and thus stay in Premier League next season. Losing teams are Shahzan Muda FC and Betaria FC; both will play in FAM League next season.

Match 1

Match 2

Champions

See also
 2012 Malaysia Super League
 2012 Malaysia Premier League
 2012 Malaysia FA Cup

References

External links
 FAM Cup 2012 at malaysiafootball-dimos
 FAM League 2012 at Soccerway
 Football Association of Malaysia

2012
3